The 2010–11 season of the Norwegian Premier League, the highest bandy league for men in Norway.

Eighteen games were played, with 2 points given for wins and 1 for draws. Solberg won the league, whereas Høvik and Drammen survived a relegation playoff.

League table

References

Seasons in Norwegian bandy
2011 in bandy
2010 in bandy
Band
Band